Mount Independence is a mountain located in the Central New York Region of New York east of the Village of Cherry Valley. Take County Route 50 from the center of Cherry Valley to the top of the mountain.

References

Mountains of Otsego County, New York
Mountains of New York (state)